Jones House is a historic home located at Boone, Watauga County, North Carolina.  It was built in 1908, and is a -story, cubic, Colonial Revival / Queen Anne style frame dwelling. It has a two-story rear extension and projecting bays. The front facade features a hipped roof single-story porch.

It was listed on the National Register of Historic Places in 1987.

References

Houses on the National Register of Historic Places in North Carolina
Queen Anne architecture in North Carolina
Colonial Revival architecture in North Carolina
Houses completed in 1908
Houses in Watauga County, North Carolina
National Register of Historic Places in Watauga County, North Carolina
1908 establishments in North Carolina